Rory McCann (born 24 April 1969) is a Scottish actor, best known for portraying Sandor "The Hound" Clegane on the HBO series Game of Thrones, Michael "Lurch" Armstrong in Edgar Wright's crime-comedy Hot Fuzz, Jurgen the Brutal in the adventure comedy Jumanji: The Next Level and the voice of Megatron in Transformers: EarthSpark.

Early life 
McCann was born in Glasgow, Scotland. He has a sister, Sally-Gay McCann, born in 1972.

Before becoming an actor, McCann was a painter who studied at the Scottish School of Forestry near Inverness. He also worked as a bridge painter (on the Forth Road Bridge), landscape gardener and carpenter. Rory McCann was first trained as an actor by writer-artist Robert Parsifal Finch in The Actor's Workshop, Glasgow in 1998.

Career 
McCann's first acting job was as an extra on the film Willow (1988). He was fired because he laughed during the takes. He appeared in an advertisement for Scott's Porage Oats, dressed in a vest and kilt. As his first major acting role, McCann played a disabled personal trainer in the 2002 television comedy drama The Book Group, winning the Scottish BAFTA for the best television performance of 2002.

Since then, he has taken television roles as Detective Inspector Stuart Brown in State of Play, Peter the Great in Peter in Paradise, and a priest in the award-winning British comedy-drama series Shameless.

He made his Hollywood debut in the 2004 film Alexander, which required the actors to go through training in the African desert, and included shooting in Thailand, Morocco, and a London studio. In 2007, he appeared as Michael "Lurch" Armstrong in Hot Fuzz. In 2008, he played Moby in The Crew and Attila the Hun in the BBC docudrama Heroes and Villains.

McCann portrayed Sandor "The Hound" Clegane in 7 out of 8 seasons of the HBO series Game of Thrones.

Other projects include a BBC TV series by writer Jimmy McGovern called Banished, set in Australia in the 18th century. McCann plays a blacksmith named Marston.

In 2022 he became the narrator of the ITV1 series DNA Journey.

Personal life 
McCann's younger sister, Sally-Gay McCann, works on costumes for film and television; he worked alongside her on Alexander and Game of Thrones. McCann is a supporter of the Scottish Green Party, and appeared in its 2007 Scottish Parliament general election broadcast.

In 1990, McCann broke multiple bones in a near-fatal rock climbing accident in Yorkshire.

McCann is the former frontman of a defunct band called Thundersoup. He plays the piano, guitar, banjo and mandolin.

McCann lives a solitary, transient lifestyle. He often lives on his boat or in places without modern conveniences. In 2006, he went to Iceland with Gerard Butler to attend the premiere of Beowulf & Grendel. He ended up living in Iceland for a year, part of the time in a tent after losing his apartment, and working as a carpenter.

Filmography

Film

Television

References

External links
 

1969 births
20th-century Scottish male actors
21st-century Scottish male actors
Living people
Male actors from Glasgow
Scottish male film actors
Scottish male television actors
Scottish male voice actors